Palatine German, also known as Palatine Dutch, is a Rhenish Franconian language  and is spoken in the Upper Rhine Valley, roughly in the area between Zweibrücken, Kaiserslautern, Alzey, Worms, Ludwigshafen am Rhein, Mannheim, Odenwald, Heidelberg, Speyer, Landau, Wörth am Rhein and the border to Alsace and Lorraine, in France, but also beyond.

The Pennsylvania Dutch language, also called Pennsylvania German, is descended primarily from the Palatine German that was spoken by Palatine refugees who emigrated to North America from the 17th to the 19th centuries and maintained their native language. Danube Swabians in Croatia and Serbia also use many elements of Palatinate German.

 spoken in the western Palatinate is normally distinguished from the  spoken in the eastern Palatinate.

The English term Palatine refers to the Palatinate region, where the language is spoken.

Pronunciation and grammar vary from region to region and even from town to town. Palatine Germans can often tell other speakers' region of the Palatinate or even their specific village.

Samples

Here are some words in Standard German and in :

This sentence is pronounced in :

In , it would be the following:

In Standard German, the sentence would read:

In English, it means:

I have already told [it to] him, but he didn't believe me.





 (Standard German)

Are you hungry too? (English)

Grammar

Grammatically, all Palatine dialects do not use the genitive case, which is replaced by the dative, with or without , and most dialects have no imperfect tense but only the perfect.

Notable speakers
 Helmut Kohl (German Chancellor 1982–1998)

See also
 Lorraine Franconian
 Riograndenser Hunsrückisch

References

Palatinate (region)
Central German languages
German dialects
Culture of the Palatinate (region)